Florian Raudaschl is an Austrian sailor. He competed at the 2012 Summer Olympics in the Men's Finn class.

References

Austrian male sailors (sport)
Year of birth missing (living people)
Living people
Olympic sailors of Austria
Sailors at the 2012 Summer Olympics – Finn